The Sulawesi swiftlet (Aerodramus sororum) is a species of swift in the family Apodidae.
It is endemic to Sulawesi.  It used to be considered a subspecies of the Moluccan swiftlet.

Its natural habitats are subtropical or tropical moist lowland forests and subtropical or tropical moist montane forests.

References
Rheindt, F.E., and R.O. Hutchinson. 2007. A photoshot odyssey through the confused avian taxonomy of Seram and Buru (southern Moluccas). BirdingASIA 7: 18–38.

Sulawesi swiftlet
Birds of Sulawesi
Sulawesi swiftlet